Dr. Franz Kalckhoff (30 November 1860 – 13 February 1955) was a German philatelist who signed the Roll of Distinguished Philatelists in 1934. He is noted as philatelic author, editor and expert on postal stationery.

See also
Kalckhoff Medal

References

Signatories to the Roll of Distinguished Philatelists
1860 births
1955 deaths
German philatelists
Recipients of the Lindenberg Medal